The South American Board of New Football Federations, also known by its acronym COSANFF (formerly known as CSANF) is the administrative and controlling body for non-FIFA football federations in South America. It was also initially affiliated with the now defunct N.F.-Board.

CSANF was founded on 25 May 2007 and is based in Buenos Aires, Argentina.
One of the founders, Gonzalo Esteban Parada is the current President.

CSANF Cup
The CSANF Cup, sometimes called the Alternative America Cup (in Spanish Copa América Alternativa), is the main competition organized by CSANF between the football teams of the peoples and regions affiliated with the CSANF. The first CSANF Cup was launched in 2011, a modest arrangement because of financial difficulties. The single match elimination of the loser was adopted.

The following Cup events were in 2014 called CSANF Cup - Fraternidad Internacional and the third was in 2017 called CSANF Cup - 10 Años o celebrate the 10th anniversary of the founding of the CSANF

Affiliated associations in Confederation of Independent Football Associations
Since 2019, CSANF has some associations affiliated to Confederation of Independent Football Associations (ConIFA).
The champion of the CSANF Cup, has the right, if affiliated at the same time with CONIFA, to qualify automatically to the following edition of the ConIFA World Cup as representative of the South American group. It is worth mentioning that this was a new opening, as until the 2019 agreement, ConIFA did not have any South American representation. However the CSANF champion was not obliged to participate in case it didn't want to. If the CSANF champion was not an affiliate or has financial issues that kept it from taking part, the CSANF runner-up (if affiliated with ConIFA) would earn the right to take part.

Members

 Isla de Pascua and Esperanto were earlier members of the now-defunct NF-Board
 Isla de Pascua and Mapuche Nation are members of ConIFA

Potential Members
  Ascension Island (United Kingdom)
  Falkland Islands/Islas Malvinas (United Kingdom)
  Galápagos Islands (Ecuador)
  Mbyá-Guaraní (Paraguay)
  Magallanes and Chilean Antarctica Region (Chile)
  Margarita Island (Venezuela)
  Martín García Island (Argentina)
  Saint Helena (United Kingdom)
  San Andrés y Providencia (Colombia)
  Táchira (Venezuela)
  Tristan da Cunha (United Kingdom)

Staff 
Currently, CSANF has representatives in 5 of 13 South American countries - Argentina, Chile, Uruguay, Brazil and Colombia - and one special representative in Spain.

In total are 16 members, including the president, vice-president and the general secretary.

Board 
  Gonzalo Esteban Parada (President)
  Thiago Fernandes Monteiro (Vice-President)
  Gonzalo Flores Domarchi (Secretary General)

Other representatives
(current and earlier)
  Facundo Mango Vorrath 
  Javier Luis Parada
  Jorge González Aburto
  Benedito Júnior
  Anderson Fernandes Borges
  Esteban Riveros Zárate
  Daniel Stéfano Cañete
  Raúl Sánchez (Special Representative)

See also
 Non-FIFA international football
 Confederation of Independent Football Associations
 World Unity Football Alliance
 N.F.-Board
 International Island Games Association, another non-FIFA governing body.

Footnotes

External links
  
 Video of an interview with the representative for Brazil in a Television Channel (in Portuguese)